Saint Bibiana is a sculpture by the Italian artist Gian Lorenzo Bernini. It sits in the high altar of the church of Santa Bibiana in Rome. Bernini received his first payment for the work in 1624, and his final payment in 1626. A seventeenth-century print of the statue exists in the Teylers Museum, Harlem, the Netherlands.

History 
Statue of Saint Bibiana is the first example of this Christian Baroque type. It was commissioned in 1624 by rediscovering of saint's body at the beginning of the pontificate of Urban VIII., who that event considered as a good sign of the beginning of his papacy. Therefore, he initiated rebuilding of the original church in the new Baroque style, also with creating of interior and new high altar of Saint Bibiana. Execution of the works and sculpture was commissioned to Gian Lorenzo Bernini.

Iconography 
Statue of St. Bibiana is created as standing female figure draped in a robe along with her attributes column and palm branches. The essence of the work is based on gestures and expressions of St. Bibiana. Her opened mouth and view heading to the skies, evokes emotional conflict of the face. While one hand is holding  the palm branch in calm, the other hand lying on the column with forearm gently in front of evoking resistance to story. Statue does not shows the ceratian point of the Saint's life, but only abstract story characterized figure. The more is possible to see emotions of Saint Bibiana and her illusive devotion. The statue is placed in a niche of the altar, which is located at the end of the church. Creating of new unusual window above of the altar brings bright glow of light and supports that mystical feeling of the whole scene. Theatricality and play with light is also created by small windows in vault of the church that illuminates statue of Saint Bibiana itself .

Contemporary Damage 
The sculpture was shown as part of the large Bernini retrospective at the Galleria Borghese in Rome (2017-18) On its return to the church of Santa Bibiana, the ring finger of the saint's right hand was broken off.

See also
List of works by Gian Lorenzo Bernini

References
Notes

Bibliography

External links
 

1620s sculptures
Marble sculptures in Italy
Sculptures by Gian Lorenzo Bernini
Sculptures of women in Italy